San Lazaro may refer to:

St. Lazarus:
 Lazarus of Bethany, a figure in the Gospel of John, which describes him being raised by Jesus from the dead
 Rich man and Lazarus, a story spoken by Jesus and unrelated to the Lazarus "raised from the dead"
 Lazarus of Persia (died 326), Persian martyr
 Lazarus Zographos (died 867), Christian saint
 Order of Saint Lazarus, a religious/military order which picked Lazarus as their patron saint
 St. Lazarus Parish, a parish in Macau
 Tomb of Lazarus (al-Eizariya), near which is the Church of Saint Lazarus

Places
San Lazaro archaeological site in the U.S. state of New Mexico
San Lázaro town in the Concepción department of Paraguay
San Lazaro Tourism and Business Park in Manila, Philippines
San Lazzaro Island in Venice, Italy
San Lazzaro di Savena, a municipality in the Province of Bologna, Italy
San Lazzaro, Sarzana, parish church and neighborhood near Sarzana, Italy
San Lazzaro, Modena, church in Modena, Italy

Mexico City
Palacio Legislativo de San Lázaro, seat of the Chamber of Deputies
Metro San Lázaro, a station on the Mexico City metro

Films
San Lazaro (film), a 2011 Filipino horror film directed by Wincy Aquino Ong